The Chicago Bears are an American football franchise currently playing in the National Football League. The following is a list of all the awards the franchise has acquired over its 90-year history.

Team league awards and honors

Individual league awards

First-team All-Pro

Jordan Howard

Pro Bowl selections

Award Winners